Those Poor Bastards are an American gothic country band based in Madison, Wisconsin. Since 2004 they have released ten full-length studio albums, six EPs and have toured in both North America and Europe. 

The band is composed of Lonesome Wyatt (vocals, guitar) and The Minister (banjo, bass, percussion, backing vocals). They are secretive and reveal very little information about themselves.

Background
Growing up, Lonesome Wyatt vaguely described his childhood as very isolated, having few friends at school and "going the whole summer" without seeing them, and that his parents "were insane". He attended Stoughton High School (Wisconsin), graduating in 1997. Inspired by Nick Cave and Johnny Cash, he began to record music in his parents' basement, where he began a solo gothic folk project called Lonesome Wyatt and the Holy Spooks before disbanding it in 2002, although the group was revived in 2010.

History 
While looking for a band name in the early 2000s, Wyatt discovered the phrase "those poor bastards" in a book, and decided to use it as the name for his band formed with another unidentified member known as The Minister. In late 2005, his father was alleged to have contacted him for fear that he was a werewolf because he could not remember where he gotten mud on his shoes. Wyatt has been questioned about the incident in various interviews. The Minister veils his face in all official band photography, does not perform live and has not revealed his identity. For live performances, Wyatt performs with a third musician, Vincent Presley, on drums, moog, and keyboard. At live shows, Presley is known to play the moog or keyboard with drums simultaneously.

Their song Pills I Took was covered by Hank Williams III on his landmark 2006 release, Straight to Hell.

Musical style and influences 
Those Poor Bastards has been described as gothic country. The band performs a style that derives from gothic rock and traditional Americana, often with themes in the genre of murder ballads. Their lyrics focus on themes of sin, damnation, misery, religion and death.

Discography
Studio albums
Songs of Desperation (2005)
Hellfire Hymns (2007)
The Plague (2008)
Satan Is Watching (2008)
Gospel Haunted (2010)
Behold the Abyss (2012)
Vicious Losers (2014)
Sing It Ugly (2016)
Inhuman Nature (2018)
Evil Seeds (2019)
Old Time Suffering (2021)
God Awful (2022)

EPs
Country Bullshit (2004)
Pills I Took (2006) (split with Hank Williams III)
Black Dog Yodel (2009)
Abominations (2009)
Gospel Outtakes (2010)
Is This Hell? (2011)
Necrosphere (2016)

References

External links
 

Musical groups from Wisconsin
Gothic country groups